Blauner is a surname. Notable people with the surname include:

Bob Blauner (1929–2016), American sociologist, professor, and author
Peter Blauner (born 1959), American author, journalist, and television producer
Stephen Blauner (1933–2015), American music manager

See also
Launer